WCUG (88.5 FM, "Cougar Radio") is a radio station licensed to the community of Lumpkin, Georgia and serves Columbus, Georgia and its metro area. Its studios are housed in the Carpenters Building on 9th Street on Columbus State University's RiverPark Campus.

On December 26, 2009, 88.5 switched its format from latin music to a Contemporary Christian radio station branded as 88.5 The Truth with a callsign of WBOJ.

88.5 The Truth was put on the air by former WCGQ Programming Director/Air Talent Lee McCard who was the morning host until July 2009. Morning successor Heath Jackson was shot and killed at his home in September 2010, in a murder case which stunned Columbus. Police arrested a suspected burglar on murder charges.

In July 2015, the station moved its programming to 107.7 FM and 103.7 WLTC-HD3 and rebranded as 107.7 The Truth. This freed up 88.5 for use by Columbus State University.

On July 1, 2015, the station launched as Cougar Radio, with programming being handled by students and faculty of Columbus State's Department of Communication. The station's programming consists of various music genres including jazz, electronic dance music, country and other programming. CSU obtained the station through a partnership with PMB Broadcasting. The broadcasting group is leasing the station's license to the university for $1 a year.

References

External links

Radio stations established in 2008
CUG
CUG
Columbus State University